Guadalupe Borja Osorno (April 4, 1915 – July 19, 1974) was First Lady of Mexico from 1964 to 1970. She was the wife of Mexican president Gustavo Díaz Ordaz.

See also

List of first ladies of Mexico 
Politics of Mexico

References

External links
Article on Borja

1915 births
1974 deaths
First ladies of Mexico
People from Mexico City